The Chinese Club Challenge Cup is a Thoroughbred handicap horse race in Hong Kong, run at Sha Tin over a distance of 1400 metres. It takes place each year on New Year's Day.

Horses rated 95 and above are qualified to enter this race.

Winners

See also
 List of Hong Kong horse races

References 
Racing Post:
 The Hong Kong Jockey Club – Racing results of Chinese Club Challenge Cup (2011/12)
 Racing Information of Chinese Club Challenge Cup (2011/12)
 The Hong Kong Jockey Club 

Horse races in Hong Kong